Orectodictya is an extinct genus of ptilodictyoid bryozoans known from Ordovician fossils found in the U.S. state of Kentucky. It is monotypic, containing the single species Orectodictya pansa.

References 

Prehistoric bryozoan genera